Group IV was split into two sub-groups.  One tournament was held in Lagos, Nigeria, February 5–9, on hard courts, while the other was held in San Marino, June 11–15,  on clay courts.

Format
The teams in each sub-group were split into two pools and played in a round-robin format. In the San Marino tournament, the top two teams from each pool advanced to a promotion pool, from which the two top teams were promoted to the Europe/Africa Zone Group III in 2004. In the Lagos tournament, no promotion round was held; the two teams which won their respective round-robin pools were promoted directly to Group III.

Lagos Half

Pool A

Results of Individual Ties

Pool B

Results of Individual Ties

Togo and Benin promoted to Group III for 2004.

San Marino Half

Pool A

Results of Individual Ties

Pool B

Results of Individual Ties

Promotion pool
The top two teams from each of Pools A and B advanced to the Promotion pool. Results and points from games against the opponent from the preliminary round were carried forward.

Results of Individual Ties

Iceland and Kenya promoted to Group III for 2004.

Placement pool
The bottom two teams from Pools A and B played off to determine places 5–7.  Results and points from games against the opponent from the preliminary round were carried forward.

Results of Individual Ties

References

2003 Davis Cup Europe/Africa Zone
Davis Cup Europe/Africa Zone